Michael Ebo Danquah is a Ghanaian professional light fly/fly/super fly/bantamweight boxer of the 1980s and '90s who won the ABU light flyweight title, WBC International light flyweight title, and Commonwealth light flyweight title, and was a challenger for the WBC International super flyweight title against Torsak Pongsupa, and ABU bantamweight title against Ernest Koffi, His professional fighting weight varied from , i.e. light flyweight to , i.e. bantamweight.

References

External links

Bantamweight boxers
Flyweight boxers
Light-flyweight boxers
Living people
Place of birth unknown
Super-flyweight boxers
African Boxing Union champions
Year of birth missing (living people)
Ghanaian male boxers